This is a list consisting of current, upcoming, and former broadcasts by the Indian Telugu TV channel ETV.

Current programming

Serials 
Sources: 
{| class="wikitable"
!Serial name
!No. of episodes
|-
|Shirdi Sai
|500+
|-
|Guvva Gorinka
|12+
|-
|Crime Patrol
|15+
|-
|Geetha Govindham
|330+
|-
|Padmavathi Kalyanam
|180+
|-
|Maa Atha Bangaram
|20+
|-
|Anupallavi|112+
|-
|Suryaputra Karna|45
|-
|Satamanam Bhavati|580+
|-
|Ravoyi Chandamama|575+
|-
|Rangula Ratnam|400+
|-
|Mouna Poratam|280+
|-
|Manasantha Nuvve|340+
|-
|srivalli 
|Coming Soon 
|}

 Reality shows 
Sources: 

 Former programming 

 Original serials 

 Dubbed fiction 

 Ananda Bhavan (2002)
 Ananda Kutumbam (1996)
 Bharyamani Udyogam (1997)
 Run (2021)
 Devimahathmyam (2011-2012)
 Jai Hanuman (2017)
 Sathi Leelavathi FIR (1997)
 Lakshyam Puttadi Bomma (1997-1998)
 Subhalagnam (2021-2022)
 Manoharam (2022)
 Jhansi Rani (2021-2022)
 Tipu Sulthan (1996)
 Rahasyam (1996-1997)
 Mayavruksham (2002)
 Harathi (2005-2007)
 Panchani Samsaram (2022)
 Premedaivam (1996-1998)
 Jeevana Sandhya (1999-2000)
 Nanna Kosam (2002)
 Guppedantha Manasu (1995-1996)
 Vasundhara (1995)
 Premalu Pellelu Bharathi (2007)
 Malgudi Kathalu (1995-1996)
 Rathri (1995-1996)
 Jeevana Sandhya (1999-2000)
 Needa (1995-1996)
 Na Bharya Katha (1996)
 Dr. Dharani (1996)
 Kshana Kshanam (1999-2000)
 Bommarillu (2021)
 Kutra (2000-2001)
 Theerpu (1995-1996)
 Stone Boy (1996)
 Prema Mandiram (2007-2012)
 Sri Krishna Leelalu (2014)
 O Chinnadana (2021)
 Vasantham (2015-2020)
 Jagadheeswari (2010-2012)
 Vichithra Bandham (2022)
 Mahabharatham (2010-2011)
 Merupu Kalalu (2007-2008)

 Non-fiction 

 Alitho Saradaga (2016–2022)
 Dial Your Star (1995-1996)
 Cinema Quiz (1995-1996)
 Cinemasala (1995)
 Countdown (1995-1996)
 Andhravani Sarigamalu Manasuna Manasai (1996-1997)
 Sunday Sandhadi Superior Home Minister (2007)
 Koyela (2007)
 Jeevana Jyothi (2011-2014)
 Star To Sardhaga (2007)
 Sumanoharalu (2006-2008)
 ATM (2011)
 Pelli Sandadi (2011)
 Indradhanassu (1995-1998)
 Jeevana Jyothi (2011)
 Love Love Love (1995-1996)
 Priyaragalu Andhame Aanandham  (1995-1999)
 Narthanasala (2012-2013)
 Get Ready (2012-2014)
 Nuvvu Ready Nenu Ready (2020-2021)
 Panduga Chesko (2019-2020)
 Manam (2018-2020)
 Smile Rani Smile (2007)
 Funtastic (2007)
 Raga (2007)
 Cine Maruti (2007)
 Star Mahila (2008-2020)
 Abhiruchi Pushpakavimanam (2017-2018)
 Kudirite Cup-pu Coffee  (2011-2012)
 Hats Off (1995)
 Horlicks Hrudayanjali (1995-1997)
 Manoranjini (1995-1996)
 Madhurimalu (1995)
 Chithramalika (1995-1996)
 Mahilalu Maharanulu (2007)
 Soundaryalahari (2014-2015)
 Sithara (1995)
 Studio Roundup (1995)
 Comic Tonic (1995-1999)
 Guinness Book (1995-1997)
 Sadhana (1995-1996)
 Prathibha (1995)
 Pragathi (1996)
 Gunshot (1998-1999)
 Movie Mirchi (2007)
 Bharathi (1996-1997)
 Animuthyalu (1995)
 Masterminds (1995)
 Janthuprapancham (1995-1996)
 Medha (1995)
 Coca-Cola Hungama (1997)
 Super Duper (2007)
 Bid 2 Win (2007)
 Prathidhwani (1995)
 Sirimuvvalu (1996)
 Nihari (1995)
 Alitho Jollygaa (2015-2016)
 Sye Sye Sayyare (2017-2018)
 Lekhavari (1996)
 Dear ETV (1996)
 Telefilms (1998-2007)
 Maha Maha Mass Yahoo (2003-2008)
 Champion (2016-2017)
 Aapatha Madhuralu (1996-1998)
 Cash 2.0 (2016–2022)

 Animated series 

 Disney Sandhya Panchathanthram (2003-2007)
 Vadina Enti Sangathi (2007)
 Bhale Denver (1995-1996)
 Sabash Tin-Tin (1996)
 Baboi Dennis''

References 

Lists of Indian television series
Lists of television series by network